Ahmet Kutsi Karadoğan (born 16 March 1973, Akçadağ, Malatya), often known as Kutsi, is a Turkish composer, pop music singer and songwriter. His first two names have been given to him from the poet Ahmet Kutsi Tecer.

Biography
Born in Malatya but he was raised in Ankara, where he started to gain fame too, but the proper fame story begins with him playing Accordion at the Bora Bar in Didim. Kutsi's introduction to music was when he won some money from scratch to win and he bought his first guitar.

Career
In 1992, he came to Istanbul with a small album that had all songs written and composed by himself but failed to attract the attention of producers. Determined, Kutsi didn't give up and continued to work with music and he managed to get the attention of the producer Erol Köse and, in a record amount of time 26 days, he managed to create his first album: Aşk Payını Aldı ("Love had its share").

He actually managed to show himself in 2005 with his album Sana Ne ("What's it to you?"). In the period of time, he made some songs for Nalan, Berksan and others. He later made a duet with Petek Dinçöz. During this time, He managed to create and host a show in, one of Turkey's best music channels, Kral TV ("King TV") and named it İlan-ı Aşk ("An old Ottoman Turkish term meaning to display love") and manage to keep in between hosting and music at, literally, the same time.

In 2006, he gained some experiences in acting as well as he took part in the Turkish version of Grey's Anatomy, named Doktorlar ("Doctors"). He made his third album, Aynı Şehirde Nefes Almak Bile Bana Yetiyor ("It's enough for me to even breath in the same city as you") and continue to climb the ladder in his music career. The reason why this album stood out more than the others is because all the instruments and all the songs were recorded live with no alternation with computers or any other electronic instruments. This album was under the direction of, Osman İşmen and also with the help of Istanbul State Symphony Orchestra.

At the summer of 2008, the album he released Aynadaki Yüzünün Karşılığı Benim "I am the reflection of you in the mirror") managed to become the first place in music lists. The album consist of several hit songs which contributed to the career of Kutsi in a good manner.

He is currently one of the three surviving members left in the program that is shown on Show TV, Korolar Carpışıyor ("Chorus' Collide") other than Öykü and Berk and Rojin.

Discography

Albums
 Aşk Payını Aldı ("Love had its share") (2000)
 Sana Ne ("What's it to you") (2005)
 Kördüğüm ("Blindchain") (2006)
 Aynı Şehirde Nefes Almak Bile Bana Yetiyor ("It's enough for me to even breath in the same city as you") (2007)
 Aynadaki Yüzünün Karşılığı Benim ("I am the reflection, in the mirror, of you") (2008)
 Bambașka ("Completely different") (2010)
 Bilmem Anlatabildim mi? ("I do not know, was I able to explain?") (2013)

Singles
 "Yaz Günü" (2014)
 "Aşıklar Şehri" (feat. Zara) (2016)
 "Söz Konusu Aşk" (feat. Meral Kendir) (2016)
 "Beşiktaşım Benim" (2016)
 "Kalbimdeki Deniz" (2016)
 "Hayranım Sana" (2020)
 "Sen Misin Tek Deli" (2021)
 "Hayatımın Anlamı" (feat. Zara) (2021)
 "Gayrı" (2022)

Music Videos 
 Soran Yok ("Nobody asked")
 Sana Ne
 Geçer ("Pass")
 Aşkın Gururu ("Honour of Love")
 Doğum Günü ("Birthday")
 Kördüğüm
 Hediyem Olsun ("Let it be my present")
 Olay Olacak Aşkımız ("Our love is going to be an incident")
 Aynı Şehirde Nefes Almak Bile Bana Yetiyor
 İlan-ı Aşk
 Aynadaki Yüzünün Karşılığı Benim

Charts

Filmography 
 Doktorlar, (Show TV, 2006–2009) – Levent Atahanlı
 Kahramanlar, (Show TV, 2009–2010) – Yiğit Özkan
 Huzur Sokağı, (ATV, 2012) – Bilal Ocak
 Beyaz Yalan, (2015) – Demir Güner
 Kalbimdeki Deniz (FOX, 2016–2018) – Mirat Yavuz
 Benim Adım Melek, (TRT1 2019–2021) – Halil Şirhan
 Annemizi Saklarken, (Star TV 2021) – Dundar Demir

References

External links
 Kutsi Fan Club

1973 births
Turkish singer-songwriters
Living people
21st-century Turkish singers